This is a sub-page for the Justification (theology) page.

Ecumenical & General
The Lutheran World Federation and The Roman Catholic Church.  Joint Declaration on the Doctrine of Justification.  English-Language Edition.  Grand Rapids: Eerdmans, 2000.  
Kärkkäinen, Veli-Matti. One With God: Salvation As Deification And Justification. Collegeville, MN: Liturgical Press, 2005. 
McGrath, Alister E.  Iustitia Dei : A History of the Christian Doctrine of Justification.  Cambridge: Cambridge University Press, 1986.  
Oden, Thomas C.  The Justification Reader.  Grand Rapids: Eerdmans, 2002.  
Seifrid, Mark A.  Christ, Our Righteousness: Paul's Theology of Justification.  Downers Grove, IL: InterVarsity Press, 2001.  
Reimer, Matthias.  An Intertextual Approach to the Paradox of Romans 2:13 and 3:20: Justified by Law Observance? Hamburg: Dr. Kovač, 2022.

Orthodox
Carlton, Clark.  The Life: The Orthodox Doctrine of Salvation.  Salisbury, MA: Regina Orthodox Press, 2001.  
Mantzaridis, Georgios I. The Deification of Man: St. Gregory Palamas and the Orthodox Tradition. Crestwood, NY: St. Vladimir's Seminary Press, 1997. 
Nellas, Panayiotis. Deification in Christ: Orthodox Perspectives on the Nature of the Human Person.  Contemporary Greek Theologians, Vol. 5.  Crestwood, NY: St. Vladimir's Seminary Press, 1987.   
Pappas, Barbara.  Are You Saved?: The Orthodox Christian Process of Salvation.  4th Ed. Westchester, IL: Amnos Publications, 1997.  
Theophan the Recluse, Saint. The Path to Salvation: A Manual of Spiritual Transformation.  Platina, CA: St. Herman Press, 1997.  
Stavropoulos, C. Partakers of Divine Nature.  Minneapolis: Light and Life Publishing, 1976.  
Ware, Kallistos.  How Are We Saved?: The Understanding of Salvation in the Orthodox Tradition.  Minneapolis: Light and Life Publishing, 1996.

Roman Catholic Church
 The Catholic Church.  The Catechism of the Catholic Church.  Second Edition.  New York: Doubleday, 2003.  
 Akin, James. The Salvation Controversy. Catholic Answers, 2001. 
 Armstrong, David. A Biblical Defense of Catholicism. Sophia Institute Press, 2003. 
 Armstrong, David. More Biblical Evidence for Catholicism: Companion to a Biblical Defense of Catholicism. Authorhouse, 2002. 
Balthasar, Hans Urs von. Theo-Drama: Theological Dramatic Theory, vols. 1-5. San Francisco: Ignatius Press, 1988. 
Balthasar, Hans Urs von. The Theology of Karl Barth: Exposition and Interpretation. San Francisco: Ignatius Press, 1992. 
 Bouyer, Louis. The Spirit and Forms of Protestantism. Scepter, 2001. 
 Hahn, Scott, and Leon J. Suprenant, eds. Catholic for a Reason: Scripture and the Mystery of the Family of God. Emmaus Road, 1998. 
 Hahn, Scott. "Faith Alone: Is It Justifiable? Catholic Answers Live with Dr. Scott Hahn," 3-part audio interview. El Cajon, CA: Catholic Answers.
Hahn, Scott. "Justification: Becoming a Child of God" audio series. Saint Joseph Communications, 1995. 
Hahn, Scott. "Romanism in Romans" audio series. Saint Joseph Communications.
 Kreeft, Peter. Fundamentals of the Faith. Fundamentals of the Faith. San Francisco: Ignatius Press, 1988. 
Lubac, Henri de. Brief Catechesis on Nature and Grace. San Francisco: Ignatius Press, 1984. 
 Lubac, Henri de. The Mystery of the Supernatural. Herder & Herder, 1998. 
 Maloney, George A. The Mystery of Christ in You: The Mystical Vision of Saint Paul. Alba House, 1998. 
 Mitch, Curtis, and Scott Hahn, eds. The Letter of St. Paul to the Romans: Revised Standard Version (Ignatius Catholic Study Bible). San Francisco: Ignatius Press, 2003. 
 Ott, Ludwig. Fundamentals of Catholic Dogma. Rockford, IL: Tan Books & Publishers, 1974. 
 Pinckaers, Servais. The Sources of Christian Ethics. Catholic University of America Press, 1995. 
 Schroeder, H. J., trans.  The Canons and Decrees of the Council of Trent.  Rockford, IL: Tan Books and Publishers, 1978.  
 Sungenis, Robert A. Not by Faith Alone: A Biblical Study of the Catholic Doctrine of Justification. Queenship Publishing Company, 1997. 
 Sungenis, Robert A. How Can I Get to Heaven?: The Bible's Teaching on Salvation Made Easy to Understand. Queenship Publishing Company, 1997.

Lutheran and Anglican
Bayer, Oswald.  Living by Faith: Justification and Sanctification.  Geoffrey W. Bromiley, trans.  Grand Rapids: Eerdmans, 2003.  
Concordia Triglotta: Libri symbolici Ecclesiae Lutheranae.  St. Louis: Concordia Publishing House, 1921.
Braaten, Carl E.  Justification: The Article by Which the Church Stands or Falls.  Minneapolis: Fortress Press, 1990.  
Braaten, Carl E. and Robert W. Jenson, eds.  Union with Christ: The New Finnish Interpretation of Luther.  Grand Rapids: Eerdmans, 1998.  
Elert, Werner.  The Structure of Lutheranism.  Volume One.  Walter A. Hansen, trans.  St. Louis: Concordia Publishing House, 1962.  
Forde, Gerhard O.  The Captivation Of The Will: Luther Vs. Erasmus On Freedom And Bondage.  Grand Rapids: Eerdmans, 2005.  
Forde, Gerhard O.  Justification by Faith: A Matter of Death and Life.  Mifflintown, PA: Sigler Press, 1990.  
Hägglund, Bernt.  The Background of Luther's Doctrine of Justification in Late Medieval Theology.  Philadelphia: Fortress Press, 1980.  
Hein, David. "Austin Farrer on Justification and Sanctification." The Anglican Digest 49.1 (2007): 51–54. 
Jüngel, Eberhard. "The Freedom of a Christian: Luther's Significance for Contemporary Theology." Minneapolis: Augsburg Publishing, 1988. .
Jüngel, Eberhard. "Justification: The Heart of the Christian Faith." Edinburgh: T&T Clark, 2001. .  Originally published in German by J. C. B. Mohr in 1999.
Köberle, Adolf.  The Quest for Holiness: A Biblical, Historical and Systematic Investigation.  John C. Mattes, trans.  Minneapolis: Augsburg Publishing House, 1938.
Kolb, Robert and Timothy J. Wengert, eds.  The Book of Concord: The Confessions of the Evangelical Lutheran Church.  Minneapolis: Fortress Press, 2000.  
Luther, Martin.  The Bondage of the Will.  J. I. Packer and O. R. Johnston, trans.  Grand Rapids: Fleming H. Revell (Baker Books), 1957.  
Mannermaa, Tuomo.  Christ Present In Faith: Luther's View Of Justification.  Minneapolis: Augsburg Fortress, 2005.  
Mattes, Mark C.  The Role of Justification in Contemporary Theology.  Grand Rapids: Eerdmans, 2004.  
Pieper, Francis.  Christian Dogmatics.  Volume II.  Theodore Engelder, trans.  St. Louis: Concordia Publishing House, 1951.  
Preus, Robert.  Justification and Rome.  St. Louis: Concordia Academic Press, 1997.  
Tappert, Theodore G., ed.  The Book of Concord: The Confessions of the Evangelical Lutheran Church.  Philadelphia: Fortress Press, 1959.

Calvinist/Presbyterian/Reformed
Sproul, R. C.  Faith Alone: The Evangelical Doctrine of Justification.  Grand Rapids: Baker Books, 1999.  
Hoekema, Anthony Saved by Grace.  Grand Rapids: W.B. Eerdmans, 1989.  .
Calvin, John Institutes of the Christian Religion.  Ed. J.T. McNeill.  Philadelphia: The Westminster Press, 1960 (original, 1541).  
Buchanan, James The Doctrine of Justification. Vestavia Hills, AL: Solid Ground Christian Books, 2006 (original, 1867). 
Owen, John The Doctrine of Justification by Faith Through the Imputation of the Righteousness of Christ Explained, Confirmed and Vindicated. Grand Rapids: Reformation Heritage Books, 2006 (original, 16--). 
Waters, Guy Prentiss Justification and the New Perspective on Paul: A Review and Response. Phillipsburg, NJ: P&R Publishing, 2004. 
Oliphint, K. Scott Justified in Christ: God's Plan for us in Justification. Fearn, Scotland: Mentor, 2007. 
Piper, John The Future of Justification: A Response to N. T. Wright. Wheaton, IL: Crossway, 2007.

Arminian/Methodist/Wesleyan
Cannon, W.R. The Theology of John Wesley: With Special Reference to the Doctrine of Justification.  Lanham, MD: The University Press of America, 1984.  
Collins, Kenneth J. The Scripture Way of Salvation: The Heart of John Wesley's Theology. Nashville: Abingdon, 1997.  
Collins, Kenneth J. Wesley on Salvation: A Study in the Standard Sermons. Grand Rapids, MI: Zondervan, 1989. 
Grider, J. Kenneth. A Wesleyan-Holiness Theology.  Kansas City: Beacon Hill, 1994.  
Maddox, Randy L. Responsible Grace: John Wesley's Practical Theology. Nashville: Kingswood Books, 1994.  
Miley, John. Atonement in Christ, New York: Jennings & Graham, 1879 (O.P.)
Miley, John. Systematic Theology (2 volumes). Eaton & Mains, 1892.   (Hendrickson)
Watson, Richard. Theological Institutes (2 Volumes). New York: Lane & Scott, 1851.

Christian bibliographies